Cherial is a village Municipality  in Siddipet district in the state of Telangana in India.

Geography

Gram panchayats in Cherial mandal:

 Cherial
 Aknoor 
 Chityal 
 Chunchanakota
 Danampalle 
 Dommata 
 Gurjakunta
 Kadavergu 
 Kasha Gudiselu
 Kotha Dommata
 Musthiyala 
 Nagapuri 
 Pedarajupet 
 Rampur
 Shabhash Gudem
 Tadoor
 [Vechareni] వేచరేణి
 Veerannapet
 Kamalayapally
 Arjunapatla

References 

Mandals in Hanamkonda district
Villages in Hanamkonda district